Mohamed Saad (born January 12, 1981) is a Yemeni former swimmer, who specialized in sprint freestyle events. Saad qualified for the men's 50 m freestyle at the 2004 Summer Olympics in Athens, by receiving a Universality place from FINA in an entry time of 29.82. He challenged seven other swimmers in heat two, including 15-year-old Malique Williams of Antigua and Barbuda. He raced to fifth place in 29.97, just 0.15 of a second off his entry time. Saad failed to advance into the semifinals, as he placed eightieth overall out of 86 swimmers in the preliminaries.

References

External links
 

1981 births
Living people
Yemeni male swimmers
Olympic swimmers of Yemen
Swimmers at the 2004 Summer Olympics